Óscar Bonfiglio Martínez (October 5, 1905 – November 4, 1987) was a Mexican football goalkeeper, and Olympian, who played for the Mexico national team in the 1930 World Cup.

Career
Bonfiglio was the first goalkeeper beaten in World Cup history, with a goal by France forward Lucien Laurent. In two matches he conceded 10 goals: the most in the tournament. At the time, he played for the club Marte FC. Bonfiglio suffered an injury and retired from playing at age 28.

Bonfiglio played for Mexico at the 1928 Amsterdam Summer Olympics.

Personal
Bonfiglio was the father of actor Oscar Morelli.
Bonfiglio was credited to be the founder of Mexican football team Irapuato FC back in 1948. Bonfiglio was also of Italian descent.

References

Sources
 A.Gowarzewski : "FUJI Football Encyclopedia. World Cup FIFA*part I*Biographical Notes – Heroes of Mundials" ; GiA Katowice 1993
 A.Gowarzewski : "FUJI Football Encyclopedia. World Cup FIFA*part II*History World Championship " ; GiA Katowice 1994

External links
 
 

1905 births
1930 FIFA World Cup players
1987 deaths
Mexico international footballers
Mexican people of Italian descent
Footballers at the 1928 Summer Olympics
Olympic footballers of Mexico
Footballers from Sonora
People from Guaymas Municipality
Association football goalkeepers
Mexican footballers